The Piano Sonata No. 2 in G minor, Op. 22 was composed by Robert Schumann from 1830 to 1838.

It was his last full-length attempt at the sonata genre, the other completed ones being the Piano Sonata No. 1 in F sharp minor (Op. 11) and the Piano Sonata No. 3 in F minor (Op. 14); he later wrote Three Piano Sonatas for the Young Op. 118. Because it was published before the F minor sonata, it was given an earlier sequence number (No. 2) but still kept its later opus number (Op. 22).  This has caused confusion, and recordings of the G minor Sonata have sometimes been published as "Sonata No. 3".  There was also an earlier sonata in F minor, which Schumann abandoned; this is sometimes referred to as "Sonata No. 4". 

Among his sonatas, this one is very frequently performed and recorded. Because of its great variety and highly virtuosic demands, it is enjoyed both by audiences and performers alike. Clara Schumann claimed to be "endlessly looking forward to the second sonata", but nevertheless Robert revised it several times. At Clara Schumann's request, the original finale, marked Presto passionato was replaced with a less difficult movement in 1838. Clara considered it “not too incomprehensible,” though she admitted that she would “play it if necessary, but the masses, the public, and even the connoisseurs for whom one is really writing, don’t understand it.”

The Andantino of the sonata is based on Schumann's early song "Im Herbste"; Jensen describes the first movement as having "a concern with motivic structure". It is dedicated to Schumann's friend the pianist Henriette Voigt and was published in September 1839.

The four movements are:

References

External links
 
  performed by Pavle Krstic

Piano music by Robert Schumann
1838 compositions
Schumann 2
Compositions in G minor